The 1984–85 Soviet Cup was an association football cup competition of the Soviet Union. The winner of the competition, Dinamo Kiev qualified for the continental tournament.

Competition schedule

First preliminary round
All games took place on July 31, 1984.

Second preliminary round
All games took place on August 10 (or 20), 1984.

Round of 32
The base game day was September 17, 1984

Round of 16
The base game day was October 28, 1984

Quarter-finals
The base game day was May 10, 1985

Semi-finals

Final

External links
 Complete calendar. helmsoccer.narod.ru
 1984–85 Soviet Cup. Footballfacts.ru
 1984–85 Soviet football season. RSSSF

Soviet Cup seasons
Cup
Cup
Soviet Cup